Boris Becker and Patrik Kühnen were the defending champions, but did not participate this year.

Olivier Delaître and Stéphane Simian won in the final 6–3, 6–3, against Shelby Cannon and Byron Talbot.

Seeds

  Jacco Eltingh /  Paul Haarhuis (first round)
  Luke Jensen /  Murphy Jensen (first round)
  Scott Melville /  Gary Muller (first round)
  Henrik Holm /  Anders Järryd (quarterfinals)

Draw

Draw

External links
Draw

Doubles